William W. Watson Sr. was a Republican Party political leader in Edgecombe County, North Carolina. He served in the North Carolina House of Representatives.

In 1881 he served in the North Carolina House of Representatives along with fellow Edgecombe County representative Clinton Wesley Battle who was also African American.

See also
African-American officeholders during and following the Reconstruction era
List of first African-American U.S. state legislators

References

Year of birth missing
Year of death missing
19th-century American politicians
People from Edgecombe County, North Carolina
African-American state legislators in North Carolina
19th-century African-American politicians
Republican Party members of the North Carolina House of Representatives